Christmas flood may refer to:

Christmas Flood of 1717 in the Netherlands, Germany and Scandinavia
Christmas flood of 1964 in western North America